Fuego is the fifth studio album by Puerto Rican rock band La Secta, released on November 24, 2008, by Sony International. Two singles were released: "No Puedes Parar" and "Déjalos Que Hablen".

The band members have said that the album was an attempt to return to a more "organic sound and less fused", similar to their first albums.

Track listing

La Secta AllStar albums
2008 albums